David or Dave Wallace may refer to:

Arts and entertainment
 David Foster Wallace (1962–2008), American novelist and essayist
 David Rains Wallace (born 1945), author on conservation and natural history
 David Wallace (American actor) (born 1958), American actor
 David Wallace (Scottish actor), Scottish actor and theatre director
 David Wallace (The Office), fictional CEO of Dunder Mifflin on the US TV series The Office
 David Wallace (composer) (born 1982), Irish composer and conductor

Politics
 David Euan Wallace (1892–1941), British Conservative member of parliament
 David G. Wallace, American businessman and politician, mayor of Sugar Land, Texas

 David Wallace (Indiana politician) (1799–1859), American politician, governor of the state of Indiana
 David Wardrope Wallace (1850–1924), Canadian MP for Russell, 1903–1904

Sports
 Dave Wallace (baseball) (born 1947), coach and player
 Dave Wallace (cricketer), American cricketer
 David Wallace (catcher) (born 1979), American professional baseball player
 David Wallace (footballer), New Zealand international football (soccer) player
 David Wallace (rugby union) (born 1976), Irish rugby union player

Other
 David Frederick Wallace (1900–1957), architect and brother of First Lady of the United States Bess Truman
 David A. Wallace (1917–2004), urban planner and architect
 David R. Wallace (1942–2012), American software engineer and inventor
 David Wallace (executive) (1908–1974), Ford executive
 Sir David Wallace (physicist) (born 1945), British physicist and Master of Churchill College, Cambridge
 Sir David Wallace (surgeon) (1862–1952), Scottish surgeon
 David Wallace (medievalist), British scholar of medieval literature

See also
David Wallis Reeves (1838–1900), composer
David Wallace-Wells,  American journalist